Rob McKee (born November 20, 1985) is a Canadian politician, who was elected to the Legislative Assembly of New Brunswick in the 2018 election. He represents the electoral district of Moncton Centre as a member of the Liberal Party. He was re-elected in the 2020 provincial election. He has been the leader of the opposition in New Brunswick, since 2022.

Education
Fluently bilingual in English and French, his education includes a Bachelor of Laws from Université de Moncton, a Bachelor of Applied Management in Accounting from the University of New Brunswick in Saint John, a Diploma in Accounting from the New Brunswick Community College and a high school diploma from the Athol Murray College of Notre Dame in Wilcox, Saskatchewan.

Political career
Prior to his election in the legislature, he served as a city councillor for Moncton City Council, elected in 2016.

Currently the Leader of the Official Opposition and critic for Health, Rob McKee has also held the critic portfolios for Justice and Attorney General and Finance and Treasury Board. Also a lawyer, he practiced at Fowler Law in Moncton.

Personal life
He is married to Tara (Pobihushchy) McKee with two children, Michael and Anna.

Rob McKee is a third generation McKee to be elected to the New Brunswick Legislature as his father and grandfather were both Members of the Legislative Assembly. Michael McKee represented Moncton North from 1974 to 1993 and Killeen McKee represented Kent from 1940 to 1950.

Electoral record

References

Living people
Moncton city councillors
New Brunswick Liberal Association MLAs
21st-century Canadian politicians
1985 births
Members of the Legislative Assembly of New Brunswick